Georgina Quintana (born 1956) is a Mexican artist.

Quintana studied Spanish literature at the University of Mexico from 1974 to 1976, and printmaking with Mario Reyes in 1974; she also took classes in drawing with Héctor Xavier, and studied at the Escuela Nacional de Pintura, Escultura y Grabado "La Esmeralda" from 1977 to 1980.  She also studied abroad. She has exhibited her work in various venues in Mexico, including in Campeche, Morelia, and Aguascalientes, and she received the Antonio Robles Prize in 1985.

References
External Links

Georgina Quintana

1956 births
Living people
Mexican women painters
20th-century Mexican painters
20th-century Mexican women artists
21st-century Mexican painters
21st-century Mexican women artists
National Autonomous University of Mexico alumni
Escuela Nacional de Pintura, Escultura y Grabado "La Esmeralda" alumni